Bob Robinson (born 10 September 1958) is a Canadian former wrestler who competed in the 1984 Summer Olympics. Robinson was born in Montreal, Quebec, Canada.

References

External links
 

1958 births
Living people
Sportspeople from Montreal
Olympic wrestlers of Canada
Wrestlers at the 1984 Summer Olympics
Canadian male sport wrestlers
Commonwealth Games gold medallists for Canada
Wrestlers at the 1982 Commonwealth Games
Commonwealth Games medallists in wrestling
Pan American Games bronze medalists for Canada
Pan American Games medalists in wrestling
Anglophone Quebec people
Wrestlers at the 1983 Pan American Games
Medalists at the 1983 Pan American Games
Medallists at the 1982 Commonwealth Games